A conventicle originally signified no more than an assembly, and was frequently used by ancient writers for a church. At a semantic level conventicle is only a good Latinized synonym of the Greek word church, and points to Jesus' promise in Matthew 18:20, "Where two or three are met together in my name." It came to be applied specifically to meetings of religious associations, particularly private and secret gatherings for worship. Later it became a term of deprecation or reproach, implying that those of whom it was used were in opposition to the ruling ecclesiastical authorities; for example, it was applied to a cabal of mutinous monks in a convent or monastery. Ultimately it came to mean religious meetings of dissenters from an established church, held in places that were not recognized as specially intended for public worship or for the exercise of religious functions. It implied that a condition of affairs obtained in which the State made a distinction between a form or forms of religion whose practice and propagation were authorized by statute, and such as were expressly prohibited by enactment. This usage has received legal sanction in Britain.

Jesus' disciples as conventiclers
In accordance with the accepted usage of the word, Church historians properly assert that Christianity took its rise ecclesiastically from a conventicle. Such was the meeting in the Upper Room of the first disciples of Christ after the Ascension (Acts 1:13). This gathering was the type of those which soon began to meet for prayer, mutual edification, and memorial observances, in private houses such as that of Mary, the mother of John (Ac 12:12). Within a short time they drew upon themselves the suspicions of the Jewish ecclesiastical authorities, who branded the new faith as impermissibly heretical, and instituted a persecution directed to the harrying and suppression of these conventicles, one of their most zealous agents being he who became the Apostle Paul.

Conventicles in the early Roman Empire
When Christianity became a world religion and spread in all directions throughout the Roman Empire, it was at first tolerated, and enjoyed Government protection, along with many other cults in vogue. Religions had to receive licence from the State, which was jealous to secure itself against the danger of conspiracies maturing under the guise of religious confraternities. Its meetings thus became strictly conventicles.

Historians have used the term to characterize such house-meetings as that mentioned in Col 4:15. In the succeeding century the catacombs were the scene of Christian conventicles.

Conventicles in the later Roman Empire
With the establishment of Christianity by Constantine as the State religion, all its meetings were legitimized, and the term of odium could no longer be rightly applied. In the 4th and 5th centuries the description again became applicable to the meetings of such Christian nonconformists as the Montanists and the Donatists, which were prohibited by the State under penalty of proscription and death. This policy was rigorously encouraged by the leaders of the Churches enjoying State recognition and support.  The 6th canon of the Synod of Gangra pronounces against conventicles.

Conventicles in pre-Reformation Europe
In England the word was early applied to the meetings of the followers of Wyclif, who, recognizing the incompetence and neglect of the regular clergy, sent out peripatetic preachers to meet the spiritual needs of the people. Both the practice and the word were carried by the Lollards (as the most determined supporters of Wyclif were called) to Scotland, where they did much to initiate or strengthen the movement of revolt from the ecclesiastical domination of Rome.

England under the Tudors

It was not, however, till after the Reformation that 'conventicle' became a term with a legal connotation, according to which it was descriptive of the meeting-place or assemblage for worship or consultation of those who departed from the Established Church of England. Queen Elizabeth, in her contest with Puritanism, strenuously asserted the royal supremacy in matters religious and ecclesiastical, and insisted upon the rigorous application of the Act of Uniformity, which demanded that all subjects of the realm must conform to the usages and tenets of the Church established by law. Clerical nonconformity was punished by deposition.

As the result of the inquisition that followed, so many ministers were deprived of their livings that their places either could not be filled at all or were filled by incompetent and unpopular substitutes. Large numbers of the people refused to accept the ministrations of these substitutes, and gathered together for worship in private houses or other suitable places. These conventicles were, under that name, expressly declared illegal. The 11th Article of the Book of Canons (drawn up in 1603) censures 'the maintainers of conventicles'; the 12th, 'the maintainers of constitutions made in conventicles,' and the 73rd runs thus : 
'Forasmuch as all conventicles and secret meetings of priests and ministers have ever been justly accounted very hateful to the state of the Church wherein they live, we do ordain that no priests or ministers of the Word of God, nor any other persons, shall meet together in any private house or elsewhere to consult upon any matter or course to be taken by them, or upon their motion or direction by any other, which may any way tend to the impeaching or depraving of the doctrine of the Church of England, or the Book of Common Prayer, or any part of the government or discipline now established in the Church of England, under pain of excommunication ipso facto.' 

Under these enactments the adherents of Anabaptism, which had been propagated in England by refugees from the Continent, were ordered to leave the Kingdom. Even during the subsequent reign of Puritanism, the meetings of this particular body were regarded and treated after the same fashion by the Protector Cromwell, who was incensed by their aggressive fanaticism. For other persecuted sects, with only one or two exceptions, there was a breathing-space of toleration and freedom.

In England, there were three acts of Parliament passed to coerce people to attend Church of England services and to prohibit unofficiated meeting of laymen:

The Religion Act 1592, stated to last for just one parliament, called for imprisonment without bail of those over the age of sixteen who failed to attend church, who persuaded others to do the same, who denied Her Majesty's authority in ecclesiastical matters, and who attended unlawful religious conventicles.

The Conventicle Act 1664 forbade conventicles of five or more people, other than an immediate family, meeting in religious assembly outside the auspices of the Church of England. This law was part of the Clarendon Code, named for Edward Hyde, 1st Earl of Clarendon, which aimed to discourage nonconformism and to strengthen the position of the Established Church.

The Conventicles Act 1670 imposed a fine of five shillings for the first offence and ten shillings for a second offence on any person who attended a conventicle (any religious assembly other than the Church of England). Any preacher or person who allowed his house to be used as a meeting house for such an assembly could be fined 20 shillings and 40 shillings for a second offence.

England under the Stuarts
After the Restoration of the Stuart dynasty, established Episcopacy once more became intolerant under the aegis of Charles II. An Act of Uniformity was promulgated in 1662, which ordained the expulsion from his charge of any clergyman who refused to subscribe to everything contained in the Book of Common Prayer and to the doctrine of the King's supremacy in matters ecclesiastical, and held by the Solemn League and Covenant of 1643, prohibiting such from exercising his religious functions in private houses. 2000 clergymen were ejected from their livings in one day for declining to comply with these tests. This enactment was reinforced in 1664 by a statute called 'the Conventicle Act,' which rendered illegal any gathering in a private house for religious worship attended by a number exceeding by five the regular members of the household, under penalty of fine, imprisonment, or transportation. A second version of this Act deprived these outed ministers of the right of trial by jury, and empowered any justice of the peace to convict them on the oath of a single informer, who was to be rewarded with a third of all fines levied. Large numbers of nonconformists were put in jail. Pepys, in his diary of August 7, 1664, observes: 'I saw several poor creatures carried by, by constables, for being at conventicles ... I would to God they would conform.' He refers to Quakers, who were amongst the worst sufferers during the persecution consequent on the passing of the Acts. Bishop Burnet, in his History of his own Time, admiringly describes how they resolutely declined to obey the law, and openly and fearlessly continued their prohibited meetings. They would hold them in the street before the closed doors of their meeting-houses, when these were shut by order. The children, who might not be arrested because of their youth, would also hold conventicles in the street in the absence of their parents in jail, suffering patiently the jeers and cuffs of magistrates and unsympathetic onlookers.

Scotland under the Stuarts
There were various answers given in Scotland as how to react to the persecution of Presbyterian Christianity under James VII and Charles I. Scottish ministers did not regard complete separation from the Church of Scotland as an option.

Identical measures were taken in Scotland under Charles II as had been taken in England only now it was to secure the suppression of Presbyterianism in Scotland, where it had been the popular and dominant form of religion since the Reformation. From 1662 to 1678 various Acts were passed by the Privy Council and the Court of High Commission, prohibiting conventicles and imposing penalties of increasing severity upon those who attended them, masters being made responsible for their servants, landlords for their tenants, magistrates for the citizens of the burghs over which they presided. It was forbidden to supply denounced persons with meat or drink, or to harbour or have intercourse of any kind with them. These measures proving unavailing to effect their purpose, it was ultimately enacted that attendance should incur the penalty of death. Those in command of the military, and even the common soldiers themselves, were given authority to inflict it immediately on the spot of capture, without the formality of a legal trial — an authority which was used without scruple or mercy in numerous instances by such as Claverhouse. This policy proved, however, quite abortive. The bulk of the religious population in the south and south-west districts continued to attend the conventicles, which were arranged and conducted by the outed ministers. Where the congregation was too large for any suitable private house, resort was had to barns, granaries, or such like commodious buildings. Frequently, however, the number of those who flocked to these illegal gatherings amounted to thousands, and the result was the institution of field-conventicles — meetings held, sometimes under cover of night, in the open air, on moors or hills, or in glens and ravines, or wherever safety and suitability could be combined.

These frequently lasted for hours, the preaching taking up a large portion of the time. At such conventicles, the ordinances of the Church according to Presbyterianism were faithfully observed. Baptism was administered, and Communion was dispensed, often to hundreds together, and even thousands, the rite taking days to celebrate, several ministers officiating in turn. When repressive measures became more severe and attendance at these gatherings was enacted to be a capital offence, the men came armed with such rude weapons as were obtainable — scythes, flails, etc. 

A Presbyterian theology covering amongst other topics conventicles and even armed resistance to tyranny was given in Alexander Shields' work A Hind let Loose. It is (says MacPherson) in the second half of the book that Shields’ power as a thinker is manifested. Under seven heads, he discusses the fundamental social, political, and ecclesiastical questions of the day. These heads are concerning (i) hearing of curates, (ii) owning of tyrants’ authority, (iii) unlawful imposed oaths, (iv) field meetings, (v) defensive arms vindicated, (vi) the extraordinary execution of judgment by private persons, and (vii) refusing to pay wicked taxations vindicated. The last-named section was added, Shields tells us, as an afterthought.

Sentinels were posted at look-out points; for the royalist soldiery, aided by spies and informers, often succeeded in surprising these meetings. It was the attack upon such a conventicle that precipitated the battle of Drumclog, 11 June 1679, which issued in the only victory gained by the Covenanters (as the upholders of Presbyterianism were called), and the only defeat sustained by Claverhouse (known in song as 'Bonnie Dundee'), the most zealous and efficient of the military persecutors. During the years of persecution culminating in the 'Killing Times,' it is calculated that some 18,000 people suffered in one way or another for attending these conventicles.

Conventicles of believers in Reform were held in Scotland in the 1500s and are considered to have been instrumental in the movement that drove the French regent Mary of Guise from power. From 1660 to the 1688 Revolution conventicles were usually held by Covenanters opposed to Charles II's forced imposition of Episcopalian government on the established Church of Scotland.

In order to protect the Presbyterian polity and Calvinist doctrine of the Church of Scotland, the pre-Restoration government of Scotland signed the 1650 Treaty of Breda with King Charles II to crown him king and support him against the English Parliamentary forces. At his Restoration in 1660, the King immediately renounced the terms of the Treaty and his Oath of Covenant, which the Scottish Covenanters saw as a betrayal.

The Rescissory Act 1661 repealed all laws made since 1633, effectively ejecting 400 Ministers from their livings, restoring patronage in the appointment of Ministers to congregations and allowing the King to proclaim the restoration of Bishops to the Church of Scotland. The Abjuration Act of 1662 ..was a formal rejection of the National Covenant of 1638 and the Solemn League and Covenant of 1643. These were declared to be against the fundamental laws of the kingdom. The Act required all persons taking public office to take an oath of abjuration not to take arms against the king, and rejecting the Covenants. This excluded most Presbyterians from holding official positions of trust. 

The resulting disappointment with Charles II's religious policy became civil unrest and erupted in violence during the early summer of 1679 with the assassination of Archbishop Sharp, Drumclog and the Battle of Bothwell Bridge. The Sanquhar Declaration of 1680 effectively declared the people could not accept the authority of a King who would not recognise their religion, nor commit to his previous oaths. In February 1685 the King died and was succeeded by his Roman Catholic brother the Duke of York, as King James VII.

James was eventually deposed in England favour of his nephew, the Calvinist Stadtholder of several provinces of the Netherlands, William III of Orange and his wife, James' Protestant daughter Mary. In Scotland a Convention of the Estates was called in Edinburgh and at this convention it was decided after considerable deliberation that, England having been conquered by William of Orange and his troops with little or no resistance, Scotland would support William and Mary's claim to the throne of Scotland. However, in the ensuing rebellion against the Williamite coup, some of James' loyal followers – the original "Jacobites", among whose ranks were many Highlanders – inflicted a heavy defeat on the new government's forces at Killiecrankie. The redcoats at this battle were no locally raised militia, but were in fact the renowned Scots Brigade – a famous unit of Scottish professional soldiers in Dutch service some of whom had come over to Britain with William. Thus in a bizarre twist of fate, it fell to a small band of men self-consciously called the Cameronian Guard after the rebel followers of the martyred Covenanter preacher Richard Cameron, to defend the new government in a small but significant battle fought in the streets of Dunkeld against the recently victorious Jacobites. Thus former rebels fought to uphold the once-again ascendant Calvinist Protestant order in defence of the Covenant against the defenders of the old Episcopalian and Roman Catholic establishment. The Cameronians managed to hold out long enough for the government to bring in reinforcements and for the Jacobite advance to falter. The tables were now turned and once the rebellion was defeated, the Cameronians, heirs to the victims of government-mandated "pacification" at the hands of units like the Scots Greys, were used to police the Highlands and restore order.

Ejected preachers such as John Blackadder conducted religious ceremonies at conventicles. Many of the covenanting prisoners on the Bass Rock had been charged with attending conventicles.

Scotland after the Revolution
After the Revolution of 1688 and the accession of William of Orange to the British throne, an Act of Toleration was passed, relating to England, which exempted from the penalties of the laws against conventicles those who took the oath of allegiance and subscribed to the doctrinal sections of the Thirty-nine Articles. Meeting-houses were required to be registered, and then came under protection of the law. In Scotland all the repressive Acts were abrogated; Presbyterianism was somewhat restored by the State to its ecclesiastical supremacy although there were some Cameronian Dissenters among others who did not like the terms of the restoration. There was more toleration in Scotland after the revolution even before the legislation regarding the Establishment of the Church of Scotland at the Act of Union.

In the Low Countries
During the merciless and prolonged attempt of Philip II. of Spain in the Netherlands to compel conformity to the Roman Catholic Church, the Protestant party headed by Les Gueux ('The Beggars') were forbidden free exercise of their worship, and immediately field-preachings were organized all over the country, of the same character as those in Scotland — conducted by the excommunicated ministers and surrounded by armed guards and sentinels.

France

The same scenes were enacted in the southern districts of France during the heroic struggle of the Huguenot Camisards ('les Enfants de Dieu,' as they called themselves) to assert religious freedom against the suppressive measures of Louis xiv., inspired by Cardinal Richelieu's vision of a unified France, spurred by the incitements of Madame de Maintenon (herself once a Huguenot), and encouraged by the eloquence of the great preacher Jacques-Bénigne Bossuet. Their field-conventicles were called desert-preachings — the name 'desert' being borrowed from the Bible as descriptive of the solitary places, in wild mountain-regions, in which the meetings were commonly held. Antoine Court for example led the church while living in dens and holes in the ground. Paul Rabaut lived a similar lifestyle living as roughly as Alexander Peden in Scotland. A peculiarity of these Camisard gatherings was the large part played by the 'prophets' — men and women, and occasionally children, generally quite uneducated and often normally of small capacity for speech or thought — who spoke or were accepted as speaking under the direct inspiration of the Holy Spirit, after the manner of the prophets in the primitive Church (Peyrat, Hist, des pasteurs du dissert, Paris, 1842; C. Tylor, The Camisards, London, 1893).

Finland
In Finland the conventicle has remained the base activity especially in the Finnish Awakening revivalist movement.

Germany
In the history of German Protestantism the conventicle played a part in Pietism. The collegia pietatis, established by Philipp Spener and his followers, provoked the opposition of the strictly orthodox Lutherans, and considerable disturbance was the result, as at Frankfurt, where the police interfered. All sorts of scandal were rife about these conventicles, and the over-enthusiastic manner in which some of them were conducted, lent colour to the charges. In Württemberg a wise middle course was adopted. Those conventicles in which the great principles of Lutheranism were respected received legal sanction, while the more radical assemblages were banned.

Sweden
In Sweden, Pietist conventicles existed as early as 1689, rousing similar opposition. The Conventicle Act of 1726 forbade all conventicles conducted by laymen, though private devotional meetings under the direction of the clergy were permitted, this law not being repealed until 1858.

Philipp Jakob Spener called for such associations in his Pia Desideria, and they were the foundation of the German Evangelical Lutheran Pietist movement. Due to concern over possibly mixed-gender meetings, sexual impropriety, and subversive sectarianism conventicles were condemned first by mainstream Lutheranism and then by the Pietists within decades of their inception.

Russia
In Russia, with the Orthodox Church in a position of ecclesiastical supremacy recognized by the State, that conventicles were held. Measures of repression were from time to time directed by the Government against dissenting sects which have incurred its suspicion and hostility, such as the Old Believers, Stundists and Doukhobors, who were denied the liberty of private meetings for worship. The spirit of tolerance seemed, however, for a while, to be rapidly gaining ground, and nonconformists of any kind, on giving satisfactory assurances to the police, were generally permitted liberty of worship according to their accepted mode.

Japan
Japanese Christian pacifist Uchimura Kanzō founded the Non-church movement in 1901.  By 1979 about 35,000 people belonged to the movement, which had spread from Japan to Taiwan and South Korea.

United States
The growth of conventicles is closely related to Pietism and the Charismatic Movement.  In the American Lutheran Church, in particular, there has been considerable debate about conventicles stemming from 17th and 18th century Pietism.  Thompson attributes today's Lutheran mission societies, ladies societies, youth groups, Bible studies, group devotions beyond actual church services, Lutheran elementary schools and high schools, and charitable and fraternal organizations associated with the church as all forms of conventicles. According to C. F. W. Walther, the founder of the Lutheran Church–Missouri Synod, such movements had to be opposed or carefully monitored, a caution that remains in effect.

According to Neville, the tradition of conventicles in Celtic lands can be found in the outdoor worship quite common in American communities, such as the South, that had been populated by Celtic ancestors.  Neville describes it as folk tradition and ritual.  Among the forms conventicles take are frontier revivals, family reunions, and cemetery services as well as the more recent house church movement.

Conventicles in other religions
According to Smith the mosque is a conventicle rather than an ecclesiastical institution. The mosque is an initiative of the community rather than a body led by a priesthood. In particular the Jama'at Khana (or ) approximates the status of a conventicle.

Early Mormon meetings were sometimes referred to as conventicles.

Citations

Sources

Christian terminology
Lutheran liturgy and worship
Protestantism-related controversies
Radical Pietism